Lindrothius is a genus of beetles in the family Carabidae, containing the following species:
 Lindrothius aeneocupreus Heinz, 1971
 Lindrothius aequistriatus Kurnakov, 1961
 Lindrothius caucasicus Chaudoir, 1846
 Lindrothius grandiceps Kurnakov, 1961
 Lindrothius horsti Reitter, 1888
 Lindrothius laticaudis Kurnakov, 1961
 Lindrothius mandibularis Kurnakov, 1961
 Lindrothius praestans Heyden, 1885
 Lindrothius pseudopraestans Kurnakov, 1961
 Lindrothius recticaudis Kurnakov, 1961
 Lindrothius robustus Kurnakov, 1961
 Lindrothius sotshiensis Zamotajlov, 1997
 Lindrothius stricticaudis Kurnakov, 1961
 Lindrothius subpraestans Kurnakov, 1961

References

Platyninae